Amorbia nuptana is a species of moth of the family Tortricidae. It is found from Venezuela to Guatemala, where it is found at altitudes between 650 and 1,620 meters.

The length of the forewings is 11.2–12.5 mm for males and 14.4–14.6 mm for females. The ground colour of the forewings is golden brown with hazel brown subbasal and median fascia and termen. The hindwings are brownish with yellow scales in the anal area.

The larvae feed on Guarea bullata. Full-grown larvae reach a length of about 20 mm.

References

Moths described in 1875
Sparganothini
Moths of North America
Moths of South America